Lilly McElroy (born 1980, in Willcox, Arizona) is an American photographer. Her best known effort might be "I Throw Myself At Men", which involved her boyfriend, later husband, photographing her as she literally threw herself at men.

Exhibitions (selection) 
 2000 Spring Show – Solar Culture Gallery, Tucson
 2003 Locations – Lionel Romback Gallery Solo Exhibition, Tucson
 2004 Last Show – Flash Gallery, Tucson
 2005 Wish/Alchemy – Center on Contemporary Art, Seattle
 2006 WPA/C's Experimental Media Series – Cowboys, Clichés, Codes, and Conspiracies, Corcoran Gallery of Art, Washington, DC
 2007 Lilly invites you to watch the sunset with her – Roger Smith Lab Gallery NY
 2008 8th International Photographic Triennial – Tampere
 2008 I throw myself at men – Thomas Robertello Gallery, Chicago
 2008 Three Hours Between Planes – Werkschauhalle Leipzig
 2009 Lodz Photo Festival, Lodz
 2009 Gravity Buffs – Thomas Robertello Gallery, Chicago
 2009 I kicked a dog. – Hudson D. Walker Gallery, Provincetown, MA
 2010 2009 Was A Rough Year Project
 2010 Framed – Indianapolis Museum of Art, Indianapolis
 2011 Lilly McElroy - Southeastern Center for Contemporary Art (SECCA), Winston-Salem, NC 
 2012 Contemporary Relationships - Indiana University Art Museum, Bloomington, IN

References

External links 
 Lilly McElroy – Homepage
 Women in Photography – wipnyc.org
 Come watch the sunset with Lilly! – YouTube Video, 2008-02-12
 Lilly McElroy at artfacts.net

American contemporary artists
American women photographers
1980 births
Living people
People from Willcox, Arizona
21st-century American women